Major Edric Frederick Gifford, 3rd Baron Gifford, VC (5 July 1849 – 5 June 1911) was an English recipient of the Victoria Cross, the highest and most prestigious award for gallantry in the face of the enemy that can be awarded to British and Commonwealth forces.

Military career
Edric Gifford was born in London on 5 July 1849. His father was Robert Francis Gifford, 2nd Baron Gifford, and his mother was Hon. Swinburne Frederica Charlotte FitzHardinge Berkeley. His brother was Maurice Gifford, CMG, who raised "Gifford's Horse" in the Second Matabele War.

He was educated at Harrow, and in 1869 entered the 83rd Foot. On the death of his father in 1872, he became 3rd Baron Gifford.

In 1874, at the age of 23, Gifford was a lieutenant in the 2nd Battalion, 24th Foot (later the South Wales Borderers), British Army during the Third Anglo-Ashanti War, when the events took place which resulted in the award of his Victoria Cross with the citation:

In 1876, Gifford left the 24th Foot, moving to the 57th Foot. In 1878 he was in Cyprus, and in 1879 he was aide-de-camp to Sir Garnet Wolseley in the Anglo-Zulu War. Shortly afterwards he retired from the Army as a brevet major.

Colonial administrator

Gifford married Sophia Catherine Street, the daughter of Gen. John Alfred Street, in April 1880, then went to Western Australia, which was at that time a British colony. He arrived in Western Australia in October 1880 and immediately took up an appointment to the position of Colonial Secretary, and a nomination to the Western Australian Legislative Council. After leaving Western Australia in January 1883 following disputes with the Chief Justice, Sir Henry Wrenfordsley and the Governor Sir William Robinson, Gifford was Colonial Secretary of Gibraltar from 1883 to 1887. In 1889 he became a director of the British South Africa Company.

Edric Gifford died on 5 June 1911 in Chichester, England. He had no children. His nephew John Fitzhardinge Paul Butler also won a Victoria Cross.

Edric Gifford's Victoria Cross medal is not publicly held.

Coat of arms

Notes

References
 
 Bennett, J. M., Sir Henry Wrenfordsley - Second Chief Justice of Western Australia 1880–1883, The Federation Press, Sydney, 2004, pp 32–33, 40–41, 44–49, 78.

External links
 Location of grave and VC medal (West Sussex)

1849 births
1911 deaths
People educated at Harrow School
Barons in the Peerage of the United Kingdom
South Wales Borderers officers
British military personnel of the Third Anglo-Ashanti War
British recipients of the Victoria Cross
Colonial Secretaries of Western Australia
Military personnel from London
Members of the Western Australian Legislative Council
57th Regiment of Foot officers
83rd (County of Dublin) Regiment of Foot officers
British Army recipients of the Victoria Cross
Colonial Secretaries of Gibraltar
British expatriates in Australia
Eldest sons of British hereditary barons
People from Bosham